Cascade Pichon (Haitian Creole: Kaskad Pichon) is a series of waterfalls located in the Belle-Anse Arrondissement, in the Sud-Est department of Haiti. The waterfalls are fed by an underground lake. The former Haitian dictator Jean-Claude Duvalier named Cascade Pichon one of Haiti's greatest tourist destinations.

Access 
Cascade Pichon is remote and access is difficult. The gravel road passes through riverbeds, flood plains and steep inclines.
It is located approximately one hour drive north of the village of Pichon, near Belle-Anse commune, a thirty minute hike from car parking.

Pools 
The waterfall consists of three pools:

 Bassin Dieula
 Bassin Marassa
 Bassin Chouket

References 

Waterfalls of Haiti

Geography of Haiti
Sud-Est (department)